Sebastião Pereira do Nascimento (born 24 February 1976), also known as Didi, is a Brazilian  former professional footballer who played as a striker.

In 1999, German club VfB Stuttgart signed him for $2.2 million, because they hoped he could fill the gap caused by Fredi Bobic, who had left Stuttgart for fellow German club Borussia Dortmund, but he was only substituted in twice, and because he always felt bad, he was finally forced to go into a medical control. There, the inability of the player was finally found out: cartilage damage in the knee. Stuttgart finally annulled the contract pretty quickly, and later on, various other clubs seemed to be unaware of his inability and signed him although the cartilage always remained.

He played for several clubs in the domestic leagues and Busan I'Park in South Korean K-League. Above all, he spent the peak of his career at Mexican clubs including Chiapas, Tigres and San Luis.

References

External links
 
 

Living people
1976 births
Association football forwards
Brazilian footballers
Comercial Futebol Clube (Ribeirão Preto) players
Cruzeiro Esporte Clube players
Sport Club do Recife players
Sport Club Corinthians Paulista players
Esporte Clube Juventude players
Joinville Esporte Clube players
Ituano FC players
Esporte Clube Bahia players
Paysandu Sport Club players
União São João Esporte Clube players
Busan IPark players
Chiapas F.C. footballers
Tigres UANL footballers
San Luis F.C. players
Salamanca F.C. footballers
VfB Stuttgart players
FC Aarau players
Bundesliga players
Liga MX players
Ascenso MX players
K League 1 players
Swiss Super League players
Brazilian expatriate footballers
Brazilian expatriate sportspeople in Germany
Expatriate footballers in Germany
Brazilian expatriate sportspeople in Switzerland
Expatriate footballers in Switzerland
Brazilian expatriate sportspeople in Mexico
Expatriate footballers in Mexico
Brazilian expatriate sportspeople in South Korea
Expatriate footballers in South Korea